Greci (literally meaning village/settlement) is an Arbëreshë town and comune in the province of Avellino, Campania, Italy, located about 100 km northeast of Naples and about 50 km southwest of Foggia. It is a mountain agricultural village lying astride the Apennines and represents the only existing linguistic minority in Campania; Arbereshe people have settled in Greci since the 15th century.

Its territory borders the following municipalities: Ariano Irpino, Castelfranco in Miscano, Faeto, Orsara di Puglia, Montaguto, Savignano Irpino.

People
Filomena Boscia, mother of American showman Regis Philbin. He showed his family-tree on an episode of the show Live with Kelly and Ryan
Joseph J. DioGuardi Sr., father of Joseph J. DioGuardi.

References

Sources

Arbëresh settlements
Cities and towns in Campania